Bertrand Fourcade (born Laloubère, 27 December 1942) is a former French rugby union player, a current coach and a sports director. He played as a fullback.

Fourcade has an average career as a player for FC Lourdes, where he won the French Championship, in 1967/68, and Stade Toulousain, never being capped for France.

He was more successful as a coach. He was in charge of FC Lourdes, when he was invited to become the coach of Italy, in 1989. He would be the coach of the Italian squad until 1993. During the 1991 Rugby World Cup, he achieved a win over the United States (30-9), but was eliminated after the 1st round.

He was the coach of the France Universities national team, from 1996 to 2000.

Fourcade moved once more to Italy, where he would coach Unione Rugby Capitolina, from 2003/04 to 2004/05. He returned then to France, where he coached FC Lourdes, in 2008/09.

References

External links
Bertrand Fourcade Player Statistics

1942 births
Living people
French rugby union coaches
French rugby union players
Rugby union fullbacks
Sportspeople from Hautes-Pyrénées